Marry the Poor Girl is a 1921 American silent comedy film directed by Lloyd Ingraham and starring Carter DeHaven and Flora Parker DeHaven. It was based on the 1920 Broadway play of the same name by Owen Davis.The Exhibitor's Trade Review noted that the "excellent" supporting cast were not credited onscreen "possibly because it was intended to keep only the two principals in the limelight".

Cast
 Carter DeHaven as 	Jack Tanner
 Flora Parker DeHaven as 	Julia Paddington

References

Bibliography
 Connelly, Robert B. The Silents: Silent Feature Films, 1910-36, Volume 40, Issue 2. December Press, 1998.
 Munden, Kenneth White. The American Film Institute Catalog of Motion Pictures Produced in the United States, Part 1. University of California Press, 1997.

External links
 

1921 films
1921 comedy films
1920s English-language films
American silent feature films
Silent American comedy films
American black-and-white films
Films directed by Lloyd Ingraham
Associated Exhibitors films
American films based on plays
1920s American films